Glen Oak is a small community in the Hunter Region of New South Wales, Australia, shared between the Port Stephens and Dungog local government areas (LGA). Approximately two thirds of the suburb's  is located within the Port Stephens LGA while the remaining third, which is sparsely populated, is located in Dungog Shire.

Glen Oak was originally a small town, settled in the 19th century as a river port. During the late 19th and early 20th century the town included a community hall, post office, public school and general store. Declining river trade affected Glen Oak and by the 1950s much of the village itself had been abandoned. Today, very little is left to indicate that a town ever existed. However, the School of Arts hall on Clarence Town Road, built in 1899 and possibly the last community-owned hall in Australia, still stands and is used for various social activities. At the entrance to the hall are two pillars commemorating local men from the area who fought in World War I.

Only a handful of Glen Oak's original homesteads still exist, the oldest of which is Thomas Holmes' "Oakendale" (circa 1830, damaged by fire in 1909). There were also at least two homesteads overlooking the Williams River at "Langlands" between 1857 and 1970. The older of the two was destroyed by fire at about 2:30am on the morning of 20 June 1889. The second homestead, built sometime before 1892, fell into disrepair after the Second World War and was demolished in the 1970s.

Notes

References 

 

Suburbs of Port Stephens Council
Suburbs of Dungog Shire